Parliamentary elections were held in Colombia in February 1945 to elect the Chamber of Representatives. The result was a victory for the Liberal Party, which won 80 of the 131 seats.

Results

References

Parliamentary elections in Colombia
Colombia
1945 in Colombia
Election and referendum articles with incomplete results
February 1945 events in South America